is a 1982 maze arcade video game developed by General Computer Corporation and published by Midway. It is the first sequel to Pac-Man (1980) and the first entry in the series to not be made by Namco. Controlling the title character, Pac-Man's wife, the player is tasked with eating all of the pellets in an enclosed maze while avoiding four colored ghosts. Eating the larger "power pellets" lets the player eat the ghosts, who turn blue and flee.

General Computer originally made the game as a modification kit for the original Pac-Man, titled Crazy Otto. However, due to previous legal action with Atari, GCC was forced to present the project to Midway, the North American distributor of Pac-Man. Midway purchased the project and enlisted GCC to use the game as a basis for the sequel to Pac-Man. Multiple names were considered for the game, including Miss Pac-Man and Mrs. Pac-Man, before the final name was chosen for being easier to pronounce. While development had originally started without Namco's consent, company president Masaya Nakamura was brought in and provided feedback on the player character's design. The company ultimately collected the same royalties on each cabinet as they had with Pac-Man.

Ms. Pac-Man was acclaimed by critics for its improvements to the original gameplay and for having a female protagonist; some have described it as superior to Pac-Man. It has been listed among the greatest video games of all time and as one of the most successful American arcade games ever made. The game's success inspired a variety of successful merchandise, several ports for numerous home consoles and handheld systems, a television cartoon that included Pac-Man, and numerous video game sequels and remakes that spawned a Ms. Pac-Man video game spin-off series. The rights to the game are owned by Namco's successor company, Bandai Namco Entertainment.

Gameplay

The gameplay is very similar to that of Pac-Man. The player earns points by eating pellets and avoiding ghosts (contact with one causes Ms. Pac-Man to lose a life). Eating an energizer (or "power pellet") causes the ghosts to turn blue, allowing them to be eaten for extra points. Bonus fruits can be eaten for increasing point values, twice per round. As the rounds increase, the speed increases, and energizers generally lessen the duration of the ghosts' vulnerability, eventually stopping altogether.

Differences from the original Pac-Man
 The game has four mazes that appear in different color schemes and alternate after each of the game's intermissions are seen.  The pink maze appears in levels one and two; the light blue maze appears in levels three, four, and five; the brown maze appears in levels six to nine; and the dark blue maze appears in levels 10 to 14.  After level 14, the maze configurations alternate every fourth level.
 The first, second, and fourth mazes have two sets of warp tunnels, as opposed to only one in the original maze.
 The walls have a solid color rather than an outline, which makes it easier for a novice player to see where the paths around the mazes are.
 The ghosts' behavioral patterns are different, and include semi-random movement, which prevents the use of patterns to clear each round. Blinky (red) and Pinky (pink) move randomly in the first several seconds of each level, until the first reversal.  Inky (cyan) and Sue (orange) still use the same movement patterns from the previous game to their respective corners, again until the first reversal.
 Instead of appearing in the center of the maze, the fruits bounce around the maze, entering and (if not eaten) leaving through the warp tunnels. Once all fruit has been encountered, they appear in random sequence for the rest of the game, starting on the eighth round; a 5000-point banana can be followed by a 100-point pair of cherries.
 The orange ghost is called Sue, rather than Clyde; her color was later changed to purple in Pac-Land to differentiate her.
 When Ms. Pac-Man makes contact with a ghost and dies, she spins around, or as the back of the flier says, "she dramatically swoons and falls" rather than folding in on herself as the original Pac-Man did.
 The three intermissions follow the developing relationship between the original Pac-Man and Ms. Pac-Man (from when they first meet to having a stork drop off their baby). The latter served as the basis for Baby Pac-Man and is referenced in Jr. Pac-Man.
 The sound effects and music are all new.

Development
Ms. Pac-Man was originally conceived as an enhancement kit for Pac-Man called Crazy Otto, created by programmers employed at the General Computer Corporation (GCC). While Crazy Otto was under development, GCC settled a lawsuit with Atari over their Missile Command conversion kit Super Missile Attack. Part of the settlement terms barred GCC from selling future conversion kits without consent from the original game manufacturer.

Rather than scrapping Crazy Otto entirely, the programmers chose to present the completed game to Midway, Namco's American distributor of Pac-Man. Midway was enthusiastic that such a game had come to their attention, as they were hoping to capitalize on the success of Pac-Man with a sequel. They bought the rights to Crazy Otto and worked with GCC and Namco to prepare the game for release. In final development, the game's name and characters experienced multiple changes. Sprites, text, and minor game elements were altered to better reflect the Pac-Man series.

The game was initially titled Super Pac-Man, containing Pac-Man as the lead character. Inspired by the cutscenes of Crazy Otto featuring Crazy Otto's female counterpart, the lead character was made female and the game was renamed Pac-Woman. That name was dropped in favor of Miss Pac-Man, but the developers then realized that, given the third intermission showing a stork delivering a baby to Pac-Man and the player's character, confusion could arise about their relationship.  In light of this, the name was changed to Mrs. Pac-Man, and then finally to Ms. Pac-Man, which rolled off the tongue more easily. Programmer Steve Golson said "in the span of just two weeks, it went from Crazy Otto to Super Pac-Man to Miss Pac-Man." These later changes (Miss, Mrs., and Ms.) all occurred within 72 hours of actual production.

Shortly before release, Stan Jarocki of Midway stated that Ms. Pac-Man was conceived in part as a response to the original Pac-Man being "the first commercial videogame to involve large numbers of women as players," and that it was "our way of thanking all those lady arcaders who have played and enjoyed Pac-Man." According to one 1982 estimate, a majority of Pac-Man players were women. This is corroborated by marketing chief Michael Leone of the Castle Park Entertainment Center, who noted that his company "noticed a recent trend in our game pavilions that indicates a tremendous female acceptance of the Pac-Man game," further noting that it "was only natural for Midway...to introduce a Ms. Pac-Man."

GCC co-founder Doug Macrae noted that Masaya Nakamura, Namco's president at the time, gave him direct feedback on the Ms. Pac-Man character. In an interview, Macrae said, "We sent out ROMs to Midway, and they sent them over to Japan for the President of Namco, Masaya Nakamura, to look at. He said, 'Love the concept, get rid of the hair.'" He added, "There was a little bit of embarrassment [at Namco] of the fact that the sequel was being done somewhere other than in their own laboratories. ...The arrangement that Namco had with Midway was that Namco would still get their royalty on Ms. Pac-Man...and Midway could choose to do whatever they wanted in paying us a royalty in addition to Namco."

Toru Iwatani, the creator of Pac-Man, is not known to have publicly commented on Ms. Pac-Man, despite questions from reporters.

Ownership
The GCC group agreed on October 29, 1981, to give the rights to Ms. Pac-Man to Midway in exchange for royalty payments for the game's sale. At the time, Midway held the license from Namco for distribution of Pac-Man games, advertising, and merchandise in North America. After the game became wildly successful, Midway and GCC undertook a legal battle concerning merchandise royalties before ultimately reaching a settlement in 1983. This settlement stated that GCC members would be paid royalties by Midway for usage of Ms. Pac-Man in commercial contexts.

Namco (now Bandai Namco) made an additional agreement with the GCC stakeholders in 2008. While Bandai Namco does control the Ms. Pac-Man copyright and intellectual property, some royalty rights and obligations are unresolved.

AtGames dispute
In August 2019, AtGames, a company that specializes in microconsoles featuring older arcade games, acquired the royalties owed to GCC. AtGames had initially approached the GCC group members about licensing Ms. Pac-Man for potential products. Bandai Namco, on learning that AtGames had been seeking these rights for a possible mini-arcade game, filed a lawsuit against AtGames alleging that AtGames misrepresented itself as licensed to make Ms. Pac-Man products, and created Ms. Pac-Man mini-cabinets under those claims. It also alleged false advertising, unfair competition, and copyright infringement.

The case was ultimately dismissed with prejudice on October 27, 2020, following a request by Bandai Namco. Presiding Judge Vince Chhabria stated that "all involved parties [had] resolved the case of their own accord." The details of the settlement were kept confidential, and the current status of the Ms. Pac-Man royalties is undisclosed.

Beginning with the Arcade Archives release of Pac-Land in 2022, the Ms. Pac-Man character has been removed from games which previously featured her. In her place is a new character known as Pac-Mom, who also replaces her in the Pac-Man Museum + versions of Pac-Land, Pac-In-Time and Pac-Attack, and in Pac-Man World Re-Pac, a remake of Pac-Man World. Bandai Namco has not given an official reason for the change, but news outlets have assumed that it was done to avoid legal problems with AtGames.

Release
Reporter Patrick Goldstein of the Los Angeles Times reported that the game made its public debut on February 3, 1982 "in typical showbusiness style at a press conference at the Castle Park Entertainment Center in Sherman Oaks." He noted that "[t]he game is expected to appear in many video arcades during the next few weeks."

Atari, Inc. released versions for the Atari 2600, Atari 5200, Atari 7800, and Atari 8-bit family. There were also versions for the VIC-20, Commodore 64, ZX Spectrum, IBM PC, Apple II, and TI-99/4A released under the Atarisoft label. Unlike Pac-Man, most home versions of Ms. Pac-Man include all three intermission screens from the arcade game. The Atari 2600 rendition of Pac-Man was infamous for its flashing ghosts, while the 2600 port of Ms. Pac-Man had minimal flicker.

A tabletop version of Ms. Pac-Man was released in 1983 by Coleco. The unit was shaped like a miniature arcade cabinet, was controlled with a small built-in joystick, and used a multicolor vacuum fluorescent display. It was a runner-up for Stand-Alone Game of the Year at the 1983 Arcade Awards held in January 1984. In 1991, Atari Corporation released a version for the Lynx, introducing new mazes, a fourth intermission, and a power-up that gives the player a temporary speed boost.

Tengen released an unlicensed port of the game in 1988 for the Nintendo Entertainment System. In 1993, Namco released their original port of Ms. Pac-Man in North America themselves, eight years after its original release in Japan. The Genesis, Master System, and NES versions, by Tengen, and the Super NES version, by Williams Electronics, took a few liberties. They featured four different sets of mazes: the original arcade mazes, bigger mazes, smaller mazes, and "strange" mazes. There was also a Pac-Booster option that let players make Ms. Pac-Man move much faster which was only available in the original arcade game from a maintenance menu. These versions also allowed two people to play simultaneously, with player 2 as Pac-Man. The game ends at level 32, with an intermission where Pac-Man and Ms. Pac-Man say good-bye. It was released for the Game Boy Color with two new mazes and a bonus game (Super Pac-Man).

In 2001, Namco released an arcade board with both Ms. Pac-Man and Galaga in honor of the 20th anniversary of both games with the subtitle "20 Year Reunion / Class of 1981". It also features Pac-Man as a hidden bonus game. The later 25th Anniversary Edition allows all three games to be selected at the main menu. Ms. Pac-Man is included in the CD-i Arcade Classics collection (released in Europe, but not in North America). It has all of the extra features of Tengen's ports, even though neither Tengen nor Williams Electronics made this version. It is included in Namco's, Microsoft's and Atari's late 1990s series of classic game anthologies, and is an unlockable minigame in the SNES version of Pac-Man 2: The New Adventures and in Pac-Man World 2. A standalone, battery-powered version of the game released by Jakks Pacific can be plugged directly into a television. Ms. Pac-Man and four other games (Galaga, Mappy, Xevious and Pole Position) are included in a self-contained joystick hand controller. Ms. Pac-Man was also a free game bundled with every Xbox Live Arcade disc for the original Xbox. The Xbox 360 XBLA version was released on January 9, 2007, featuring an online leaderboard and twelve achievements. Ms. Pac-Man was later released on Namco Museum Volume 3; however, there is no mention of it in Namco's official archives (including the archives on all Namco Museum releases).

On July 11, 2008, Ms. Pac-Man was released for the iPhone, iPod Touch and iPad through the App Store. The ports were delisted from the App Store in July 2022. The game was also released in July for Windows Mobile. As part of Pac-Man's 30th anniversary, Ms. Pac-Man is one of the games included on the home version of Pac-Man's Arcade Party arcade machine. Pac-Man's Arcade Party was succeeded eight years later by Pac-Man's Pixel Bash, which added 19 games to the existing roster, but Ms. Pac-Man was only available if the machine was set to Free Play. It was included as downloadable content in Pac-Man Museum for PlayStation 3, Windows and Xbox 360. In June 2020, Tastemakers' Arcade1Up decided to announce that Ms. Pac-Man would finally be added to their lineup of 3/4 scale arcade cabinets. The unit will also contain a few other Bandai Namco arcade games, including Galaxian, Pac-Mania, and Pac-Man Plus.

On April, 19, 2016, Ms. Pac-Man was released on Xbox One and PlayStation 4 as a part of the "ARCADE GAME SERIES" from Bandai Namco.

Reception

Arcade
In the United States, Ms. Pac-Man topped the monthly RePlay upright arcade cabinet charts for much of 1982, including most months between April and December. Pac-Man and Ms. Pac-Man also topped the US RePlay cocktail arcade cabinet charts for 23 months, from February 1982 through 1983 up until February 1984. It was listed as the highest-grossing arcade game of 1982 by Cash Box and the Amusement & Music Operators Association (AMOA), whereas RePlay magazine listed Donkey Kong as the year's highest-grossing title. Cash Box later listed Ms. Pac-Man as one of the top two highest-grossing arcade games of 1983, along with Pole Position. It was later listed by AMOA as one of the top five highest-grossing arcade video games of 1984.

Ms. Pac-Man sold 125,000 arcade units by 1988, grossed  by 1987, and has grossed  ( adjusted for inflation) . InfoWorld stated that Atarisoft's Ms. Pac-Man for the Commodore 64 was as good as the best-selling Atari 8-bit version. The Genesis version of the game sold more than one million copies in the United States.

The arcade game was awarded a Certificate of Merit as runner-up for Coin-Op Game of the Year at the 1982 Arcade Awards held in January 1983. In January 1984, the Atari 2600 port of Ms. Pac-Man won the Videogame of the Year award at the 1983 Arcade Awards, tied with Lady Bug.

Ports
Computer Games magazine called the Commodore 64 version a "Spectacular" and "Incredible" conversion, while stating that the Atari 5200 and IBM PC versions suffered from limitations but were nevertheless "enjoyable" ports. They later gave a "Classic" rating for other home computer versions, calling Ms. Pac-Man the "greatest" maze game. Reviewing the Super NES version, three of Electronic Gaming Monthlys four reviewers said the gameplay is timeless and universally appealing, and the enhancements appealing. The fourth, Sushi-X, felt the original game was a cheap cash-in on the popularity of Pac-Man, and had not aged well. Doctor Devon of GamePro liked the original game but questioned the value of the Super NES port since it has somewhat frustrating controls, and since Ms. Pac-Man had already appeared on the Super NES in the form of an unlockable in Pac-Man 2: The New Adventures.

In STart, Clayton Walnum praised the Lynx version's new mazes and the added twist of the lightning power-ups, and found the game transferred well to the small screen. Julian Rignall reviewed the Atari Lynx port for CVG Magazine writing that "it offers a fun and non-violent challenge which will appeal to anyone" giving a final score of 79 out of 100. Les Ellis reviewed the game for Raze Magazine in February 1991, stating that he liked the "neat little between-level scenes" and the "jolly title tune", and giving the game a final score of 79%. Robert A. Jung of IGN gave the Lynx version a final score of 8 out of 10, writing in his review, "A decent adaptation overall, and a good game in its own right."

Reviewing the Game Gear version, GamePro commented "If you loved the Pac-Man games, then you loved Ms. Pac-Man, and if you loved Ms. Pac-Man at the arcades, you'll love her here, too."

Legacy
In 1996 Electronic Gaming Monthly reported that the Genesis version of Ms. Pac-Man, which was released in 1991, was still among the top 20 best-selling Genesis games. The same year, Next Generation ranked the arcade version as number 12 on their "Top 100 Games of All Time", saying that it has aged far better than the original Pac-Man due to its smarter monster AI, varied mazes, moving fruits, and intermissions. They added, "It has the broadest appeal of any game Next Generation has seen, with the possible exception of Tetris. Women love it. Men Love it. Children love it." In 1997 Electronic Gaming Monthly listed the Genesis and Super NES versions as number 89 on their "100 Best Games of All Time", stating that the "Two-player simultaneous play and new mazes completely revive this classic." In 1999, Next Generation listed Ms. Pac-Man as number 41 on their "Top 50 Games of All Time", commenting that, "It sounds easier than it is, and it makes the game one we consistently go back to, week after week."

In 2009, Game Informer put Ms. Pac-Man 10th on their list of "The Top 200 Games of All Time", saying that it "trumped [the original Pac-Man] in nearly every way". This is down one rank from Game Informers previous best games of all-time list.  Entertainment Weekly called Ms. Pac-Man one of the top ten games for the Atari 2600 in 2013. In 2016, Ms. Pac-Man placed 5th on Time's "The 50 Best Video Games of All Time" list. In 2022, The Strong National Museum of Play inducted Ms. Pac-Man to its World Video Game Hall of Fame.

Notes

References

External links

 
 Ms. Pac-Man at the Arcade History database
 Ms. Pac-Man for the Atari 2600 at Atari Mania
 GCC 2004 reunion audio Presentation by GCC alumni of their company history, including development of Ms. Pac-Man
 Twin Galaxies leaderboard for Ms. Pac-Man arcade scores (registration required)

1982 video games
Arcade video games
Atari 2600 games
Atari 5200 games
Atari 7800 games
Atari 8-bit family games
Atari Lynx games
Commodore 64 games
VIC-20 games
Game Boy games
Game Boy Color games
Game Gear games
Video games about ghosts
IOS games
Maze games
Midway video games
Now Production games
Mobile games
Nintendo Entertainment System games
North America-exclusive video games
Original Xbox Live Arcade games
Pac-Man arcade games
Video game sequels
Sega Genesis games
Master System games
Super Nintendo Entertainment System games
Tengen (company) games
TI-99/4A games
Tiertex Design Studios games
Tiger Electronics handheld games
Vertically-oriented video games
Video game characters introduced in 1982
Video games developed in the United States
Video games featuring female protagonists
Video games scored by Alex Rudis
Windows Mobile Professional games
Xbox 360 Live Arcade games
ZX Spectrum games
World Video Game Hall of Fame
Multiplayer and single-player video games